Ostředek is a municipality and village in Benešov District in the Central Bohemian Region of the Czech Republic. It has about 400 inhabitants.

Administrative parts
Villages of Bělčice, Mžižovice, Třemošnice and Vráž are administrative parts of Ostředek.

Geography
It lies in the Benešov Uplands. The Ostředecký Brook springs here, flows across the municipality and supplies a system of ponds.

History
The first written mention of Ostředek is from 1356.

Transport
The D1 motorway from Prague to Brno leads across the municipality.

Sights
The landmark of Ostředek is the Ostředek Castle. It is a Baroque building with Neoclassical modifications. The castle complex includes the valuable Chapel of Saint John of Nepomuk, which was added to the castle in 1739.

Notable people
Svatopluk Čech (1846–1908), writer
Gusta Fučíková (1903–1987), publisher and Communist politician

References

External links

Villages in Benešov District